Lorenzo 2002 – Il quinto mondo is the ninth studio album by Italian singer-songwriter Jovanotti.
As with Jovanotti's previous releases, Il quinto mondo reflects the singer's activism in areas such as politics, globalization, human rights and ecology, as well as his interest in world music, although love songs are also represented. The main single from the album, "Salvami" ("Save Me"), contains a controversial reference to the Italian right-wing war reporter Oriana Fallaci as "the journalist-writer who loves war because it reminds her of the times when she was young and beautiful" and it was mentioned in Tiziano Terzani's anti-war book Lettere contro la guerra.

Track listing
 "Salvami" – 4:04
 "Un Uomo" – 7:40
 "Albero di Mele" – 4:36
 "Ti Sposerò" – 5:04
 "Morirò d'Amore" – 4:16
 "La Vita Vale" – 4:59
 "Noi" – 3:55
 "Salato Parte Uno" – 3:59
 "Salato Parte Due" – 5:02
 "Canzone d'Amore Esagerata" – 6:49
 "(Storia di Un) Corazon" – 4:38
 "Il Quinto Mondo" – 4:32	
 "Date al Diavolo Un Bimbo Per Cena" – 11:54
 "30 Modi Per Salvare il Mondo" – 4:15

Personnel
 Pier Foschi: drums, backing vocals
 Riccardo Onori: guitar, banjo, mandolin, sitar, backing vocals
 Giovanni Allevi: piano, keyboards, backing vocals
 Ernesttico Rodriguez: percussions, backing vocals
 Saturnino: bass guitar, double bass, backing vocals
 Roberta "Robertina" Magnetti: backing vocals
 Roberta Bacciolo: backing vocals
 Elena Bacciolo: backing vocals

Footnotes

External links
Official album site
Lyrics

2002 albums
Italian-language albums
Mercury Records albums
Jovanotti albums